Pretense or pretence may refer to:
 pretext
 pretexting (social engineering)
 "Pretense" (Stargate SG-1), an episode of Stargate SG-1
 "Pretense", a song by Knuckle Puck from their 2015 album Copacetic
 "Pretence", a song by Jolin Tsai from her 2006 album Dancing Diva
 a pretender's claim to the throne
 accismus

See also
 Deception
 Camouflage
 False pretenses, in criminal law